Hugh Rose, 15th Baron of Kilravock and Chief of Clan Rose, (1663–1732) was one of the Scottish representatives to the first Parliament of Great Britain as MP for Nairnshire.

Early life  
Rose was born at Kilravock Castle the son of Hugh Rose, 14th of Kilravock, a member of the Parliament of Scotland for Nairnshire and his wife, Margaret Innes, daughter of Sir Robert Innes of Innes, 2nd Baronet. He inherited Kilravock on his father's death in 1687 along with the Barony of Kilravock and the Chiefdom of the Name and Arms of Clan Rose. On his father's death, the Rose estates were heavily encumbered, it was only by successive marriages to heiresses that the estates were saved and brought out of debt.

Political career  
Early in his career Rose began as a commissioner for Justice in the Highlands in 1693 and 1701. He was then returned as an MP for Nairnshire from 1700 until 1707. During his time in office, he remained in opposition, particularly to the Darien scheme. Rose served until 1707 at which point he became one of the Scottish representatives to the first Parliament of Great Britain. Whilst one of the representatives, Rose refused to travel to London to represent his constituency and did not stand foe re-election. He was also appointed Sheriff of Ross from 1706-22 and also 1729–32. Whilst Sheriff, although he himself had resigned from Parliament, he used his position to appoint his son, Hugh MP for Ross-shire. Due to his abuse of power, the other major powers in Ross-shire, the Clans Ross and Munro petitioned to have him removed from office as Sheriff, for being a Jacobite Whig and ally of George Mackenzie, 1st Earl of Cromartie. However, Roses allies all supported him as the most loyal of Presbyterians. However, the following General election his son, Hugh was removed from office and both removed from public life for a while. Following the 1715 Uprising, Rose and his son moved more into the support of Argyll through their connection through the Campbells of Cawdor, at which point he lost the position of Sheriff of Ross. However, he later regained both the Sheriffdom and also the position of Lord Lieutenant of Ross-shire for his support.

Military service 
During the Jacobite rising of 1715, Rose fought for the Government and successfully besieged and took Inverness. As well as that, he kept the Kilravock garrison strong and held it against the rebels.

Family 
Rose married, firstly, Margaret Campbell, daughter of Sir Hugh Campbell, 5th of Cawdor and Lady Henrietta Stuart, daughter of James Stuart, 4th Earl of Moray, on 19 October 1683, they had three children.
Hugh Rose, 16th of Kilravock (died 1755), MP for Ross-shire. 
Margaret Rose (died 1703), married Sir John Mackenzie of Coul, 3rd Baronet, had issue 
Mary Rose (died 1734), married Duncan Forbes, 5th of Culloden, had issue. 

He married, secondly, Jean Fraser, daughter of James Fraser of Brea, in 1692, they had one child. 
James Rose (died 1762), married Margaret Rose, daughter of James Rose of Broadley, they were the parents of Hugh Rose of Brea and Broadley, husband of Elizabeth Rose, 19th of Kilravock. 

He married by contract, thirdly, Beatrix Cuthbert, daughter of George Cuthbert of Castlehill, on 19 June 1701, they had two children.  
Magdalene Rose, married Alexander Mackenzie of Davochmalmac, son of Alexander Mackenzie and Elizabeth Rose. 
Jean Rose 

He married, fourthly, Elizabeth Calder, daughter of Sir James Calder, 1st Baronet and Grizel Innes, in 1704, they had one child.  
Margaret Rose, married Charles Campbell, son of Sir Charles Campbell of Clunie. 

He married, fifthly, Katherine Porteous, daughter of James Porteous, in 1730, they had two children. 
Arthur Rose 
Alexander Rose

Rose died of a fever of cold at Kilravock, on 23 January 1732, and was buried with his forebears in the chapel of Geddes. An 18th-century panegyric conceals the quick temper and shiftiness of its subject in a portrait which would have done more credit to his mother's devout Presbyterianism than to the family's recurring talent for compromise:

References

External links

1663 births
1732 deaths
Lord-Lieutenants of Ross-shire
Scottish representative peers
Shire Commissioners to the Parliament of Scotland
Scottish justices of the peace
Members of the Parliament of Scotland 1702–1707
Members of the Parliament of Great Britain for Scottish constituencies
British MPs 1707–1708
Clan Rose
Scottish landowners